Blue Stahli  is the eponymous second studio album and the first vocal album by American multi-genre project Blue Stahli, released on March 2, 2011, however, most of the tracks had previously been released as singles. The cover artwork was created by Grant Morhman, the producer of the debut Celldweller album.

An entirely instrumental version of the album was released on January 17, 2012.

On November 27, 2018, a deluxe edition of the album was released for vinyl and Digital Download. The deluxe edition featured new tracks such as the "ULTRAnumb" acoustic, the Entropy Zero remix of "Doubt" (however is absent in the vinyl), and the long-awaited Celldweller remix of "ULTRAnumb". In addition to these new tracks were songs of the album B-Sides And Other Things I Forgot, such as "Burning Bridges" (the alternative version of "Anti-You"), the alternate version of "Takedown" featuring Xina on vocals, the acoustic version of "Scrape", and the mariachi version of "ULTRAnumb".

Track listing

Bonus Tracks

References

2011 albums
Blue Stahli albums